, son of regent Tadanori, was a kugyō or Japanese court noble of the Kamakura period (1185–1333). He held regent positions kampaku from 1305 to 1308 and sessho in 1308. A daughter of Emperor Kameyama was his consort; the couple adopted his brother Fusazane as their son. His other consort gave birth to Michinori who was in turn adopted by Fusazane.

Family
 Father: Kujō Tadanori
 Mother: Saionji Kinsuke‘s daughter
 Wife and Children:
 Wife: Emperor Kameyama‘s daughter
 Wife: Imperial Prince Moriyoshi’s daughter
 Kujō Michinori
unknown
??? (覚尊)
Seiso (1319-1368)

References

 

1273 births
1320 deaths
Fujiwara clan
Kujō family